John Stanley Sherlock (1 October 1908 – 1958) was an English footballer who played at right-half for Port Vale between 1929 and 1933. He helped the "Valiants" to win the Third Division North title in 1929–30.

Career
Sherlock played for Hanley Y.M.C.A. before joining Port Vale in May 1929. He played three times in the 1929–30 campaign, as the "Valiants" won the Third Division North title. He played seven Second Division games in the 1930–31 campaign, as Vale posted a club record fifth-place finish. He featured 12 times at The Old Recreation Ground in the 1931–32 season. He managed to post 24 appearances in the 1932–33 campaign, and scored three goals: a penalty in a 4–0 home win over West Ham United (10 September), in a 3–3 home draw with Manchester United (29 October), and another penalty in a 4–2 home win over Grimsby Town (Christmas Eve). He was transferred to Colwyn Bay United in July 1933. He joined Cheshire County League side Macclesfield Town in December 1933, playing regularly at right-full back until early April 1934.

Career statistics
Source:

Honours
Port Vale
 Football League Third Division North: 1929–30

References

1908 births
1958 deaths
People from Hoylake
English footballers
Association football wing halves
Port Vale F.C. players
Colwyn Bay F.C. players
Macclesfield Town F.C. players
English Football League players